Jure Guvo (born 31 December 1977) is a retired Croatian football striker.

References

1977 births
Living people
Footballers from Split, Croatia
Association football forwards
Croatian footballers
FK Željezničar Sarajevo players
HNK Šibenik players
Chengdu Tiancheng F.C. players
NK Međimurje players
Enosis Neon Paralimni FC players
NK Croatia Sesvete players
NK Solin players
NK Uskok players
Croatian Football League players
Cypriot First Division players
Premier League of Bosnia and Herzegovina players
First Football League (Croatia) players
Croatian expatriate footballers
Expatriate footballers in Bosnia and Herzegovina
Croatian expatriate sportspeople in Bosnia and Herzegovina
Expatriate footballers in China
Croatian expatriate sportspeople in China
Expatriate footballers in Hong Kong
Croatian expatriate sportspeople in Hong Kong
Expatriate footballers in Cyprus
Croatian expatriate sportspeople in Cyprus